Jacob Walter "Wally" Byron (Jacob Valdimar Björnsson; September 2, 1894 – December 22, 1971) was an Icelandic-Canadian ice hockey player who competed in the 1920 Summer Olympics. He was the goaltender for the Winnipeg Falcons, the Canadian team which won the gold medal. He was born and died in Winnipeg, Manitoba.

Awards and achievements
Allan Cup Championship (1920)
Olympic Gold Metalist (1920)
"Honoured Member" of the Manitoba Hockey Hall of Fame

References

External links
 
Walter Byron’s biography at databaseOlympics.com
Falcons
Wally Byron's  biography at Manitoba Hockey Hall of Fame

1894 births
1971 deaths
Canadian ice hockey goaltenders
Canadian people of Icelandic descent
Ice hockey players at the 1920 Summer Olympics
Medalists at the 1920 Summer Olympics
Olympic gold medalists for Canada
Olympic ice hockey players of Canada
Olympic medalists in ice hockey
Ice hockey people from Winnipeg
Winnipeg Falcons players